Subterranea may refer to:

Subterranea (album), album by the band IQ
Subterranea (comics), fictional underground land of the Mole Man in Marvel Comics
Subterranea (game), game for the Atari 2600 published by Imagic
Subterranea (geography), catch-all category for caves, mines, and other subterranean features
Subterranea, a soundtrack by Thom Yorke
Subterranea, a 2015 American film starring Bug Hall

See also
Subterranean (disambiguation)